The 2013–14 season was Iraklis second consecutive season in the Football League and third overall.

Iraklis beat Tyrnavos and Skoda Xanthi FC on their way to the Round of 16 in the Greek Cup, where they were eliminated by rivals PAOK.

Players

First team

Transfers

In

Summer

Winter

Out

Summer

Winter

Loan out

Club

Coaching staff

Other information

Kit

|
|
|

Pre-season and friendlies

Football League

League table

Results summary

Results by round

Matches

Promotion play-offs

Matches

Greek Cup

First round

Second round

Third round

Statistics

Appearances and goals

|-
|colspan="14"|Players who left the club in-season

Top scorers
Includes all competitive matches. The list is sorted by shirt number when total goals are equal.

Top assists
Includes all competitive matches. The list is sorted by shirt number when total assists are equal.

Disciplinary record
Includes all competitive matches. The list is sorted by shirt number when total cards are equal.

References

Greek football clubs 2013–14 season
2013–14